Redland plc was a leading British building materials business. It was listed on the London Stock Exchange and was once a constituent of the FTSE 100 Index.

History
The company was established in 1919 as a manufacturer of concrete tiles trading as the Redhill Tile Company.

In 1946, the company changed its name to Redland Tiles. In 1954, it expanded into Germany taking a minority interest in Braas, a building materials business based in Heusenstamm. The company was first listed on the London Stock Exchange in 1955. In 1959, the company purchased the Bursledon Brickworks site located in the Hampshire village of Swanwick, near Southampton. Redland held control of the brickworks until 1974, when it ceased to exist. In 1969, it started operating in Australia acquiring a significant shareholding in Monier Ltd.

In 1990, it diversified into the manufacture of plasterboard, forming a joint venture with Lafarge for that purpose.

By 1991, Braas was contributing almost half the profits of the Group. The company acquired Steetley plc, a major competitor, in 1992. It sold its UK brick manufacturing business to Ibstock in 1996.

The company was acquired by Lafarge in 1997.

In 2008 the roofing division was divested by Lafarge. The company became known as Monier Ltd and saw the return of the Redland Brand in the UK. The company is now known as Monier Redland Limited (part of the Monier Group of companies) and is based in Crawley in West Sussex.

From 2017, the business has been called BMI Redland, part of BMI Group, where BMI is an abbreviation of Braas Monier and Icopal.

External links 
 Monier Redland Ltd
  BMI Group

References 

Building materials companies of the United Kingdom
Companies based in Surrey
Manufacturing companies established in 1919
Manufacturing companies disestablished in 1997
Companies formerly listed on the London Stock Exchange
British companies established in 1919
1919 establishments in England
1997 mergers and acquisitions